Schmidtea polychroa is a species of freshwater flatworm, a dugesiid triclad that inhabits the shallow mesotrophic or eutrophic waters of rivers and lakes of Europe. It is also present in North America, where it has been introduced at least in the Saint Lawrence river system. It is an animal with a limited dispersion capability.

Diet
Individuals of this species search for food actively; they feed mainly on small invertebrates. They prey preferably on oligochaetes, and also on gastropods.

Reproduction
They are hermaphroditic. Schmidtea polychroa produces cocoons in water temperatures between 10 and 23 °C.

References

Dugesiidae